Attractin is a protein that in humans is encoded by the ATRN gene.

Attractin is a Group XI C-type lectin.

Multiple transcript variants encoding different isoforms exist for this gene. One of the isoforms is a membrane-bound protein with sequence similarity to the mouse mahogany protein, a receptor involved in controlling obesity. The other isoform is a secreted protein involved in the initial immune cell clustering during inflammatory responses that may regulate the chemotactic activity of chemokines.

References

External links

Further reading

Kelch proteins
C-type lectins